Beanland may refer to:

 Beanland Mine, gold mine in Canada
 Beanland (band), American rock band
 Beanland (surname)